{{Infobox military conflict
| conflict          = Battle of Dak To
| partof            = the Vietnam War
| image             = File:NARA photo 111-CCV-634-CC44225.jpg
| image_size        = 300px
| caption           = 173rd Airborne Brigade M60 machine-gunner keeps watch before the final assault on Hill 875, 22 November 1967
| date              = 3–23 November 1967
| coordinates       = 
| place             = Dak To, Kon Tum Province, South Vietnam
| result            = See "Aftermath"
| combatant1        = 
| combatant2        =  North Vietnam Viet Cong
| commander1        = MG William R. PeersBG Leo H. Schweiter
| commander2        = Hoàng Minh Thảo(Military)Trần Thế Môn(Political)
| strength1         = 16,000
| strength2         = ~Four Regiments~6,000
| casualties1       =  361 killed15 missing1,441 wounded<ref name=Murphy>{{cite book|last=Murphy|first=Edward F.|title=Dak To: America's Sky Soldiers in South Vietnam's Central Highlands|publisher=Ballantine|year=2007|isbn=9780891419105|page=325}}</ref>40 helicopters lostTwo C-130 Hercules transport aircraft, one F-4C fighter lost 73 killed18 missing290 woundedTotal: 432 killed33 missing1,771 wounded
PAVN/VC claim 4,570 killed or wounded 70 aircraft destroyed52 vehicles (incl. 16 tanks) destroyed18 artillery pieces and 2 ammunition depots destroyed 104 guns and 17 radio sets captured
| casualties2       = US body count: ~1,000–1,664 killed~1,000–2,000 wounded275 individual and 94 crew-served weapons recovered
| campaignbox       = 
}}

The battle of Dak To in Vietnam was a series of major engagements of the Vietnam War that took place between 3 and 23 November 1967, in Kon Tum Province, in the Central Highlands of the Republic of Vietnam (South Vietnam). The action at Đắk Tô was one of a series of People's Army of Vietnam (PAVN) offensive initiatives that began during the second half of the year. PAVN attacks at Lộc Ninh (in Bình Long Province), Song Be (in Phước Long Province) and at Con Thien and Khe Sanh, (in Quảng Trị Province), were other actions which, combined with Đắk Tô, became known as "the border battles". The post hoc purported objective of the PAVN forces was to distract American and South Vietnamese forces away from cities towards the borders in preparation for the Tet Offensive.

During the summer of 1967, engagements with PAVN forces in the area prompted the launching of Operation Greeley, a combined search and destroy effort by elements of the U. S. 4th Infantry Division and 173rd Airborne Brigade, along with the Army of the Republic of Vietnam (ARVN) 42nd Infantry Regiment, 22nd Division and Airborne units. The fighting was intense and lasted into late 1967, when the PAVN seemingly withdrew.

By late October U.S. intelligence indicated that local communist units had been reinforced and combined into the PAVN 1st Division, which was to capture Đắk Tô and destroy a brigade-size U.S. unit. Information provided by a PAVN defector provided the allies a good indication of the locations of PAVN forces. This intelligence prompted the launching of Operation MacArthur and brought the units back to the area along with more reinforcements from the ARVN Airborne Division. The battles on the hill masses south and southeast of Đắk Tô became some of the hardest-fought and bloodiest battles of the Vietnam War.

Background
Border outpost

During the early stages of the U.S. involvement in the Vietnam War, several U.S. Special Forces Civilian Irregular Defense Group (CIDG) camps were established along the borders of South Vietnam in order both to maintain surveillance of PAVN and Viet Cong (VC) infiltration and to provide support and training to isolated Montagnard villagers, who bore the brunt of the fighting in the area. One of these camps was built near the village and airstrip at Đắk Tô. After 1965, Đắk Tô was also utilized as a forward operations base by the highly classified MACV-SOG, which launched reconnaissance teams from there to gather intelligence on the Ho Chi Minh Trail across the border in Laos. In 1967, under the overall direction of commander of Special Forces in Vietnam, Col. Jonathan Ladd, the camp began to take mortar fire. Ladd flew in, organized reconnaissance and identified the entrenched hill bunker complex as the source of the shelling. Journalist Neil Sheehan quoted Ladd as recommending, unsuccessfully, to Major General William R. Peers: "For God's sake, General, don't send our people in there .... That's what the bastards want us to do. They'll butcher our people. If they want to fight us, let them come down here where we can kill them."

Đắk Tô lies on a flat valley floor, surrounded by waves of ridgelines that rise into peaks (some as high as ) that stretch westward and southwestward towards the tri-border region where South Vietnam, Laos and Cambodia meet. Western Kon Tum Province is covered by double- and triple-canopy rainforests, and the only open areas were filled in by bamboo groves whose stalks sometimes reached  in diameter. Landing zones (LZs) large enough for helicopters were few and far between, which meant that most troop movements could only be carried out on foot.

Operation Greeley

In January 1967, MG Peers had taken command of the 4th Infantry Division, which had responsibility for the defense of western Kon Tum Province. Prior to the onset of the summer monsoon, Peers set up blocking positions from the 4th Infantry Division's 1st Brigade base camp at Jackson Hole, west of Pleiku, and launched Operation Francis Marion on 17 May. The 4th had on hand its 1st and 2nd Brigades, while its 3rd Brigade operated with the 25th Infantry Division northwest of Saigon.

Throughout the middle of 1967, however, western Kon Tum Province became a magnet for several PAVN spoiling attacks and it appeared that the PAVN were paying an increasing amount of attention to the area. Immediately after taking command, Peers instituted guidelines for his units in order to prevent them from being isolated and overrun in the rugged terrain, which also did much to negate the U.S. superiority in firepower. Battalions were to act as single units instead of breaking down into individual companies in order to search for their enemy. If rifle companies had to act independently, they were not to operate more than one kilometer or one hour's march from one another. If contact with the enemy was made, the unit was to be immediately reinforced. These measures went far in reducing the 4th Infantry's casualties.

These heavy enemy contacts prompted Peers to request reinforcement, and as a result, on 17 June, two battalions of Brigadier General John R. Deane's 173rd Airborne Brigade were moved into the Đắk Tô area to begin sweeping the jungle-covered mountains in Operation Greeley. The 173rd had been operating near Bien Hoa Air Base outside Saigon and had been in combat only against VC guerrillas. Prior to its deployment to the highlands, Peer's operations officer, Colonel William J. Livsey, attempted to warn the Airborne officers of the hazards of campaigning in the Highlands. He also advised them that PAVN regulars were a much better equipped and motivated force than the VC. These warnings, however, made little impression on the paratroopers, who were unaccustomed to PAVN tactics and strength in the area.

On 20 June, Company C, 2nd Battalion, 503rd Infantry Regiment discovered the bodies of a CIDG unit that had been missing for four days on Hill 1338, the dominant hill mass south of Dak To. Supported by Company A, the Americans moved up the hill and set up for the night. At 06:58 the following morning, Company A began moving alone up a ridge finger and triggered an ambush by the PAVN 6th Battalion, 24th Regiment. Company C was ordered to go to support, but heavy vegetation and difficult terrain made movement extremely difficult. Artillery support was rendered ineffective by the limited range of visibility and the "belt-grabbing" - or "hugging" - tactics of the PAVN (PAVN/VC troops were instructed to open their actions or move as close to American forces as possible, thereby negating U.S. artillery, aerial, and helicopter gunship strikes, which demanded a safety margin for utilization – hence, "grabbing the enemy by the belt). Close air support was impossible for the same reasons. Company A managed to survive repeated attacks throughout the day and night, but the cost was heavy. Of the 137 men that comprised the unit, 76 had been killed and another 23 wounded. A search of the battlefield revealed only 15 PAVN dead.

U.S. headquarters press releases, made four days after the conclusion of what came to be called "The Battle of the Slopes", claimed that 475 PAVN had been killed while the 173rd's combat after action report claimed 513 enemy dead. The men of Company A estimated that only 50–75 PAVN troops had been killed during the entire action. Such losses among American troops could not go unpunished. The operations officer of the 4th Infantry went so far as to recommend that General Deane be relieved of command. Such a drastic measure, however, would only provide more grist for what was becoming a public relations fiasco. In the end, the commander and junior officers of Company C (whose only crime was that of caution) were transferred to other units.

In response to the destruction of Company A, MACV ordered additional forces into the area. On 23 June, the 1st Battalion, 1st Brigade, 1st Air Cavalry Division arrived to bolster the 173rd. The following day, the elite ARVN 1st Airborne Task Force (the 5th and 8th Battalions) and the 3rd Brigade, 1st Air Cavalry Division arrived to conduct search and destroy operations north and northeast of Kon Tum. General Deane sent his forces 20 kilometers west and southwest of Dak To in search of the 24th Regiment.

After establishing Fire Support Base 4 on Hill 664, approximately 11 kilometers southwest of Đắk Tô, the 4/503rd Airborne Infantry found the PAVN K-101D Battalion of the Doc Lap Regiment on 10 July. As the four companies of the battalion neared the crest of Hill 830 they were struck by a wall of small arms and machine gun fire and blasted by B-40 rocket-propelled grenades and mortar fire. Any advance was impossible, so the paratroopers remained in place for the night. The following morning, the PAVN were gone. The 4/503rd suffered 22 dead and 62 wounded. The bodies of three PAVN soldiers were found on the site.

PAVN pressure against CIDG outposts at Dak Seang and Dak Sek, 20 and 45 kilometers north of Đắk Tô respectively, was the impetus for dispatching the ARVN 42nd Infantry Regiment into the area while the ARVN Airborne battalion moved to Dak Seang. On 4 August, the 1/42nd encountered the PAVN on a hilltop west of Dak Seang, setting off a three-day battle that drew in the ARVN Airborne. The 8th Airborne, along with U.S. Army advisers, was airlifted into a small unimproved air field next to the Special Forces camp at Dak Seang. The camp was under sporadic fire and probing ground attack by PAVN forces. This occurred when its Special Forces commander and a patrol failed to return and the camp received what appeared to be preparatory fire for a full scale ground attack by PAVN. The terrain was high mountains with triple canopy jungle. The importance of the Dak Seang camp was that it lay astride the Ho Chi Minh Trail, the main infiltration route of the PAVN into the South.

About a kilometer from the camp, the Army advisers and the 8th Airborne came upon the bodies of the lost Special Forces patrol, all dead, including the camp commander. As the 8th Airborne moved up the mountain, the lead elements were taking small arms fire. Before long, it was obvious that the PAVN troops had filtered down on all sides. By noon of 4 August, the 8th Airborne with its advisers were in a fight that lasted several days. When the unit finally overwhelmed the PAVN forces because of superior firepower in air and artillery, it reached the top of the mountain and found a fully operational PAVN Headquarters, complete with hospital facilities and anti-aircraft emplacements. During the three-day battle, the 8th Airborne Battalion alone withstood six separate ground attacks and casualties among all the ARVN units were heavy.

By mid-August, contact with PAVN forces decreased, leading the Americans to conclude that they had withdrawn across the border. The bulk of the ARVN Airborne units were then returned to their bases around Saigon for rest and refitting. On 23 August, General Deane turned over command of the 173rd to Brigadier General Leo H. Schweiter. On 17 September, two battalions of the 173rd departed the area to protect the rice harvest in Phú Yên Province. The 2/503rd remained at Đắk Tô along with the 3rd ARVN Airborne Battalion to carry out a sweep of the Toumarong Valley north of Đắk Tô and the suspected location of a PAVN regimental headquarters. After three weeks of fruitless searching, however, the operation was halted on 11 October. Operation Greeley was over.

Prelude

By early October, U.S. intelligence reported that the North Vietnamese were withdrawing regiments from the Pleiku area to join those in Kon Tum Province, thereby dramatically increasing the strength of local forces to that of a full division. In response, the 4th Infantry began moving the 3rd Battalion, 12th Infantry and the 3rd Battalion, 8th Infantry into Đắk Tô to launch Operation MacArthur. On 29 October, the 4/503rd Airborne Infantry returned to the area as a reinforcement. The battalion was moved west of Đắk Tô to the Ben Het CIDG Camp to protect the construction of Fire Support Base 12 on 2 November. The PAVN's official history places the context for the PAVN/VC as a directive from the General Staff for battlefields groups increase operations to allow local forces and units to preserve strength, and for battlefields groups to conduct exercises and gain experience.

On 3 November, Sergeant Vu Hong, an artillery specialist with the PAVN 6th Regiment, defected to the South Vietnamese and was able to provide U.S. forces with detailed information on the disposition of PAVN forces and their objectives, both at Đắk Tô and at Ben Het, 18 kilometers to the west. The PAVN had fed approximately 6,000 troops into the area, most of which made up the 1st Division. The 66th Regiment was southwest of Đắk Tô preparing to launch the main attack, while the 32nd Regiment was moved south to prevent any counterattacks against the 66th. The independent 24th Regiment held positions northeast of Đắk Tô to prevent reinforcement of the base from that direction. The 174th Regiment was northwest of Đắk Tô, acting as a reserve or an offensive force as the situation dictated. In addition, the 1st Division was supported by the 40th Artillery Regiment. The goal of these units was the taking of Đắk Tô and the destruction of a brigade-size American unit.

The PAVN actions around Đắk Tô were part of an overall strategy devised by the Hanoi leadership, primarily that of General Nguyen Chi Thanh. The goal of operations in the area, according to a captured document from the B-3 Front Command, was "to annihilate a major U.S. element in order to force the enemy to deploy as many additional troops to the Central Highlands as possible." As the Americans quickly discovered, the area had been well prepared by the PAVN. The number and elaborateness of defensive preparations found by U.S. and ARVN troops indicated that some had been prepared as much as six months in advance. As General Peers noted:

Nearly every key terrain feature was heavily fortified with elaborate bunker and trench complexes. He had moved quantities of supplies and ammunition into the area. He was prepared to stay.

After contact with the PAVN forces on the 4th and 5th, Schweiter received orders to move the rest of his brigade back to Đắk Tô. Their immediate goal was first to establish a base of operations and bolster the defenses at Ben Het. They would then begin to search for the headquarters of the 66th Regiment, which U.S. intelligence believed to be in the valley stretching south of FSB 12. Simultaneously, most of the remaining elements of the 4th Infantry Division moved into the area around Đắk Tô. They were joined by two 1st Cavalry battalions (the 1/12th and 2/8th Cavalry) and ARVN forces consisting of the four battalions of the 42nd Regiment and the 2nd and 3rd Airborne Battalions. By this time, the village and airstrip had become a major logistical base, supporting an entire U.S. division and airborne brigade and six ARVN battalions. The stage was set for a major pitched battle.

Battle

The first fighting of the new operation erupted on 3 November when companies of the 4th Infantry came across PAVN defensive positions. The next day the same thing occurred to elements of the 173rd. The American and ARVN troops soon applied a methodical approach to combat in the highlands. They combed the hills on foot, ran into fixed PAVN hill-top defensive positions, applied massive firepower, and then launched ground attacks to force the PAVN off. In all of these instances, PAVN troops fought stubbornly, inflicted casualties on the Americans, and then withdrew.

To expand the coverage of supporting artillery fires, the 4/503rd Airborne Infantry was ordered to occupy Hill 823, south of Ben Het, for the construction of Fire Support Base 15. Since the rest of the battalion's companies were already deployed elsewhere, the 120 men of Company B would combat assault onto the hilltop by helicopter alone. After several attempts to denude the hilltop with airstrikes and artillery fire, Company B landed unopposed that afternoon, but the hill was not unoccupied. Fifteen minutes later, contact was made with the PAVN. The battle that ensued raged at close quarters until early the following morning when elements of the 66th Regiment withdrew, leaving behind more than 100 bodies. Nine men of Company B were killed and another 28 were wounded.

The following morning Company B was relieved by Lt. Col. David J. Schumacher's 1/503rd, which (against the admonitions of Colonel Livsey) was divided into two small Task Forces. Task Force Black consisted of Company C supported by two platoons of Company D and Task Force Blue which was composed of Company A and the remaining platoon of Company D. Task Force Black left Hill 823 to find the PAVN who had attacked Company B, 4/503rd. At 08:28 on 11 November, after leaving their overnight laager and following a PAVN communications wire, the force was ambushed by the 8th and 9th Battalions of the 66th Regiment and had to fight for its life. Task Force Blue and Company C, 4/503rd was sent to relieve the beleaguered Task Force Black. They encountered fire from all sides during the relief attempt, but they made it, reaching the trapped men at 15:37. U.S. losses were 20 killed, 154 wounded, and two missing.

The commanding officer of Task Force Black, Captain Thomas McElwain, reported a PAVN body count of 80, but was commanded by Schumacher (whose conduct of the action later came under severe criticism) to go out and count again. He then reported back that 175 PAVN soldiers had been killed. He later stated that "If you lost so many people killed and wounded, you had to have something to show for it." McElwain and Schumacher later clashed over McElwain's recommendation for a decoration for Private First Class John Andrew Barnes, III, who had leapt on a grenade and sacrificed his life to save wounded comrades during the action. Schumacher refused to endorse the recommendation, stating that he did not think medals were for "men who committed suicide." Barnes was later awarded the Medal of Honor.

The PAVN claim that during the battle against the 1/503rd from 8 to 11 November, they lost 32 killed or wounded.

The PAVN simultaneously attacked the three companies of the 3/8th Infantry on Hill 724. Beginning at 13:07 and lasting for thirty minutes, a mortar barrage rained onto the battalion's laager site. PAVN troops then charged out of the jungle to the attack. By the time the action ended at 19:03, 18 Americans were dead and another 118 were wounded. The 4th Infantry claimed that 92 PAVN had died in the clash.

An Associated Press article from 12 November quoted the PAVN death toll to have risen above 500 with 67 US troops having also died.

On the night of 12 November, the PAVN launched the first of many rocket attacks against the Đắk Tô airfield, firing 44 missiles. By 08:00 on 15 November, three C-130 Hercules transport aircraft were in the turnaround area as a PAVN mortar barrage landed. Two of them were destroyed. The resulting fires and additional incoming mortars set the ammunition dump and fuel storage areas ablaze. Explosions continued all day and into the night. During that night's incoming shelling, a mortar round landed on two steel containers of C-4 plastic explosive. This was said to be the largest explosion to occur in the Vietnam War, knocking men off their feet over a mile away. The explosion destroyed the entire 15th Light Equipment Company compound next to the ammunition dump although no one was killed. Engineer Lieutenant Fred Dyerson thought "it looked like Charlie had gotten hold of some nuclear weapons." Although more than 1,100 tons of ordnance were destroyed during the explosions and fires, this was as close as the PAVN would get to taking Đắk Tô. The rapid deployment of allied forces had upset the North Vietnamese offensive and had thrown them onto the defensive. Previous actions had battered the 66th and 33rd Regiments, and they began a southwesterly retreat, covered by the 174th Regiment. The Americans and the ARVN then began to run into tenacious rearguard actions.

To prevent a repetition of the artillery attack against its base camp, the 3/12th Infantry was ordered to take Hill 1338, which had an excellent overview of Đắk Tô, only six kilometers away. For two days, the Americans fought their way up the steep slope of the hill and into the most elaborate bunker complex yet discovered, all of the fortifications of which were connected by field telephones.

After scouring the area of the PAVN who attacked Task Force Black, the three companies of 1/503rd moved southwest to occupy Hill 882. The force was accompanied by approximately a dozen civilian news correspondents. On the morning of 15 November, the lead company crested the hill and discovered bunkers connected by telephone wire. They were then attacked, and the rest of the Americans rushed to the hilltop to take defensive positions. PAVN troops poured small arms, machine gun, and mortar fire on the Americans and launched several ground attacks. The U.S. commander requested helicopter evacuation for the most seriously wounded, but this request was denied by Col. Schumacher, who demanded that the civilians be evacuated first. When the fighting ceased on 19 November the U.S. battalion had suffered seven killed and 34 wounded. The PAVN 66th Regiment left behind 51 dead.

While the action on Hill 882 was underway, Company D, 4/503rd was conducting road clearing operations around Ben Het while being accompanied by a CIDG Mike Force. While calling in an artillery fire mission, an error caused two rounds to fall on the company's position. Six Americans and three CIDG were killed outright and 15 paratroopers and 13 CIDG troops were wounded in the friendly fire incident.

ARVN units had also found plenty of action in the Đắk Tô area. On 18 November, on Hill 1416 northeast of Tan Canh, the ARVN 3/42nd Infantry found the PAVN 24th Regiment in well-fortified defensive positions. The elite, all-volunteer ARVN 3rd and 9th Airborne Battalions joined the action, attacking the hill from another direction. The ARVN forces took the hill on 20 November after vicious close-quarters fighting that claimed 66 ARVN dead and another 290 wounded. The PAVN left behind 248 of their own.

U.S. intelligence indicated that the fresh 174th PAVN Regiment had slipped westward past Ben Het and had taken up positions on an 875-meter-high hill just six kilometers from the border. The 174th had done so in order to cover the withdrawal of the 66th and 32nd Regiments, which were moving toward their sanctuaries across the Cambodian frontier. On 19 November, BG Schweiter was informed that a Special Forces Mobile Strike Force company had run into heavy resistance while reconnoitering the area. He then ordered his 2nd Battalion to take the hill.

Hill 875

At 09:43 on 19 November, the three companies (330 men) of 2/503rd moved into jumpoff positions from which to assault Hill 875. Companies C and D moved up the slope followed by two platoons of Company A in the classic "two up one back" formation utilized since World War I. The Weapons Platoon of Company A remained behind at the bottom of the hill to cut out a landing zone. Instead of a frontal assault with massed troops, the unit would have been better served by advancing small teams to envelop possible PAVN positions and then calling in air and artillery support.

At 10:30, as the Americans moved to within 300 meters of the crest, PAVN machine gunners opened fire on the advancing paratroopers. Then B-40 rockets and 57mm recoilless rifle fire were unleashed upon them. The paratroopers attempted to continue the advance, but the PAVN, well concealed in interconnected bunkers and trenches, opened fire with small arms and grenades. The American advance was halted and the men went to ground, finding whatever cover they could. At 14:30 PAVN troops hidden at the bottom of the hill launched a massed assault on Company A. Unknown to the Americans, they had walked into a carefully prepared ambush by the 2nd Battalion of the 174th Regiment.

The men of Company A retreated up the slope, lest they be cut off from their comrades and annihilated. They were closely followed by the PAVN. Private First Class Carlos Lozada held the rear guard position for Company A with his M60 machine gun. As the PAVN advanced, Lozada mowed them down and refused to retreat until he was shot dead. For his actions that day, Lozada was awarded a posthumous Medal of Honor. Soon, U.S. air strikes and artillery fire were being called in, but they had little effect on the battle because of the dense foliage on the hillside. Resupply became a necessity because of high ammunition expenditures and lack of water, but it was also an impossibility. Six UH-1 helicopters were shot down or badly damaged that afternoon trying to get to 2/503rd.

At 18:58 one of the worst friendly fire incidents of the Vietnam War occurred when a Marine Corps A-4 Skyhawk fighter-bomber, flown by LTC Richard Taber, the Commanding Officer of a Marine Air Group from Chu Lai Air Base, dropped two 500-pound Mark 81 Snakeye bombs into 2/503rd's perimeter. One of the bombs exploded, a tree burst above the center of the position, where the combined command groups, the wounded, and the medics were all located. It killed 42 men outright and wounded 45 more, including the overall on-scene commander, Captain Harold Kaufman. 1Lt. Bartholomew O'Leary, Company D Commander, was seriously wounded. (Company A's commander had been killed in the retreat up the slope). Chaplain (Major) Charles J. Watters, was killed in the blast while ministering to the wounded. For his gallantry in repeatedly exposing himself to enemy fire to retrieve the wounded on Hill 875, he was awarded a posthumous Medal of Honor.

The next morning, the three companies of 4/503rd were chosen to set out and relieve the men on Hill 875. Because of intense PAVN sniper and mortar fire (and the terrain) it took until nightfall for the relief force to reach the beleaguered battalion. On the afternoon of 21 November, both battalions moved out to take the crest. During fierce, close-quarters fighting, some of the paratroopers made it into the PAVN trenchline but were ordered to pull back as darkness fell. At approximately 23:00, the 4th Division's 1/12th Infantry was ordered to withdraw from an offensive operations in the southern Central Highlands and redeploy to Đắk Tô. In a night-time air redeployment, the entire battalion redeployed and took up positions around the main fire support base at Đắk Tô in less than 12 hours.

The following day was spent in launching airstrikes and a heavy artillery bombardment against the hilltop, totally denuding it of cover. On 23 November, the 2nd and 4th Battalions of the 503rd were ordered to renew their assault while the 1/12th Infantry assaulted 875 from the south. This time the Americans gained the crest, but the PAVN had already abandoned their positions, leaving only a few dozen charred bodies and weapons.

The battle of Hill 875 had cost 2/503rd 87 killed, 130 wounded, and three missing. 4/503rd suffered 28 killed 123 wounded, and four missing. Combined with noncombatant losses, this represented one-fifth of the 173rd Airborne Brigade's total strength. For its combined actions during operations around Đắk Tô, the 173rd Airborne Brigade was awarded the Presidential Unit Citation.

Aftermath
By the end of November, the PAVN withdrew back into their sanctuaries in Cambodia and Laos, failing to wipe out a major American unit, yet forcing the U.S. Army to pay a high price. 376 U.S. troops had been killed or listed as missing-presumed dead and another 1,441 were wounded, in the fighting around Đắk Tô. The fighting had also taken a toll on the ARVN with 73 soldiers killed. U.S. munitions expenditures attested to the ferocity of the fighting: 151,000 artillery rounds, 2,096 tactical air sorties, 257 B-52 strikes. 2,101 Army helicopter sorties were flown, and 40 helicopters were lost. The U.S. Army claimed that 1,644 PAVN troops had been killed by body count, but this figure quickly became a source of contention due to allegations of body count inflation. During the battle, one company commander alleges after losing 78 men while finding 10 enemy bodies, the "enemy body count" figures were deliberately re-written as 475 by General William Westmoreland and released as official operational reports.

Another figure of some significant contention was the claim from the Vietnam News Agency quoted in an Associated Press report that 2,800 U.S. soldiers and 700 ARVN had perished in the fighting.

In his memoirs, General William C. Westmoreland, U.S. commander in Vietnam, mentioned 1,400 PAVN casualties, while MG William B. Rosson, the MACV deputy commander, estimated that the PAVN lost between 1,000 and 1,400 men. Not all American commanders were happy with the friendly to enemy loss ratio. U.S. Marine Corps General John Chaisson questioned "Is it a victory when you lose 362 friendlies in three weeks and by your own spurious body count you only get 1,200?" Major General Charles P. Stone, who succeeded Peers as commander of the 4th Infantry Division on 4 January 1968, later described the methods that U.S. commanders had previously used in the highlands as "stupid." Stone was particularly critical of Schweiter and his performance at Dak To. "I had the damnest time (after my arrival in Vietnam) getting anybody to show me where Hill 875 was," he told interviewers following the war. "It had absolutely no importance in the war thereafter. None. It had no strategic value... It made no difference... that the enemy held all those mountains along the border because they controlled no people, no resources, no real growing areas and suffered a horrible malaria rate. Why... go out there and fight them where all the advantages were on... [their] side."

MACV asserted that three of the four PAVN regiments that participated in the fighting had been so battered that they played no part in the next phase of their winter-spring offensive. Only the 24th Regiment took the field during the Tet Offensive of January 1968. The 173rd Airborne Brigade and two battalions of the 4th Infantry Division were in no better shape. General Westmoreland claimed that "we had soundly defeated the enemy without unduly sacrificing operations in other areas. The enemy's return was nil." But Westmoreland's claim may have missed the point. The border battles fought that fall and winter had indeed cost the PAVN dearly, but they had achieved their objective. By January 1968, one-half of all U.S. maneuver battalions in South Vietnam had been drawn away from the cities and lowlands and into the border areas. The official, post-war, PAVN history is more sanguine, viewing their results as the infliction of casualties on a brigade, two battalions and six companies of US forces.

Operations in and around the Central Highlands including previous battles at Hill 1338 had rendered the 173rd Airborne combat ineffective, and they were ordered to Tuy Hòa to repair and refit. The 173rd was transferred to Camp Radcliff in An Khê and Bong Son areas during 1968, seeing very little action while the combat ineffective elements of the brigade were rebuilt.

Several members of Westmoreland's staff began to see an eerie resemblance to the Viet Minh campaign of 1953, when seemingly peripheral actions had led up to the climactic Battle of Dien Bien Phu. General Giap even laid claim to such a strategy in an announcement in September, but to the Americans it all seemed a bit too contrived. Yet, no understandable analysis seemed to explain Hanoi's almost suicidal military actions. They could only be explained if a situation akin to Dien Bien Phu came into being. Then, almost overnight, one emerged. In the western corner of Quảng Trị Province, an isolated Marine outpost at Khe Sanh, came under siege by PAVN forces that would eventually number three divisions.

Three members of the 173rd Airborne Brigade (Maj. Charles J. Watters, Pfc. John A. Barnes III and Pfc. Carlos Lozada) all posthumously received the Medal of Honor for their actions during the battle.

References

Bibliography
Published government documents
 Brewer, Maj. Robert R. and Sp5 Roger E. Hester, Vietnam: The Third Year – 173rd Airborne Brigade. Japan, 1968.

Memoirs
 Ketwig, John, "...and a hard rain fell: A GI's True Story of the War in Vietnam". Illinois: Sourcebooks, Inc, 2002.
 Clodfelter, Micheal., "Mad Minutes and Vietnam Months".  McFarland, 1988
 Arthurs, Ted G., "LAND WITH NO SUN: A Year in Vietnam With the 173rd Airborne (Stackpole Military History Series)". Stackpole Books, 2006.

Secondary sources
 Garland, Albert N., A Distant Challenge: The U.S. Infantryman in Vietnam, 1967–1972. Nashville TN: The Battery Press, 1983.
 Maitland, Terrence, Peter McInerney, et al., A Contagion of War''. Boston: Boston Publishing Company, 1983.

Further reading

External links

 
 Detailed Map of Battle Slopes

Conflicts in 1967
1967 in Vietnam
Battles and operations of the Vietnam War
Battles involving the United States
Battles involving Vietnam
Battles and operations of the Vietnam War in 1967
History of Kon Tum Province
November 1967 events in Asia